Thomas Brian Harvey Goodwin Wormald (24 July 1912 – 22 March 2005) was a British historian.

He was born in 1912 and his father was the Anglican rector of Solihull, Warwickshire. He was educated at Harrow School and Peterhouse, Cambridge, where he obtained a First in both parts of the Historical Tripos, as well as winning academic prizes. He was then a research student at St John's College, Cambridge before returning to Peterhouse in 1938. He was much influenced by Herbert Butterfield and admired his scepticism towards received wisdom in historical interpretations.

He was ordained as an Anglican deacon during the Second World War and he also attended a theological college which had been evacuated to Cambridge. He later served as chaplain and dean of Peterhouse. However, in the 1950s Wormald became alienated from the Church of England due to what he saw as its backsliding and compromises. He admired Pope Pius XII's definition of the Assumption of Mary and converted to Catholicism.

Wormald specialised in seventeenth century English history and his first work was a study of Edward Hyde, 1st Earl of Clarendon, which was published in 1951. Wormald demonstrated that the divide between Cavalier and Roundhead did not emerge until shortly before fighting began in 1642, thereby undermining the notion of the English Civil War as "the English Revolution".

He was married to the sister of Lord Lloyd and they had four sons, one of whom was the historian Patrick Wormald. After his death, The Times said "Wormald had one of the most distinguished historical minds of his generation".

Works
Clarendon: Politics, History and Religion 1640-1660 (Cambridge University Press, 1951, 1976, 1989). 
Francis Bacon: History, Politics and Science, 1561-1626 (Cambridge University Press, 1993).

Notes

1912 births
2005 deaths
People educated at Harrow School
Alumni of Peterhouse, Cambridge
20th-century British historians
20th-century Anglican deacons
English Revolution